Moulvi Ruhul Amin was a Member of the 4th National Assembly of Pakistan as a representative of East Pakistan.

Career
Amin was a Member of the  4th National Assembly of Pakistan representing Noakhali-II. He was nominated by the Muslim League.

References

Pakistani MNAs 1965–1969
Living people
Year of birth missing (living people)